The 1950 season of the Cook Islands Round Cup was the first season of top flight association football competition in the Cook Islands. Titikaveka won the championship.

References

1950 domestic association football leagues
1950 in the Cook Islands
Football competitions in the Cook Islands